Karrinyup Shopping Centre is a shopping centre built in 1973 in Karrinyup, a suburb of Perth. After an $800 million redevelopment, the centre is one of the largest shopping centres in Western Australia.

Centre history
Prior to the current centre being built, a smaller Karrinyup Shopping Centre was constructed in 1964 on a  corner site. This was built as the precursor to a larger centre expected to be constructed in the future. The original centre was constructed by LJ Wallis of Osborne Park and owned by Karrinyup Investments of Scarborough. Valued at £12,500 (1964), it consisted of a grocer, greengrocer, deli, butcher, chemist, hairdresser, draper, news agent, post office, bank agency, and parking for 100 cars.

During the latter part of the 1960s, the Metropolitan Regional Planning Authority developed the Corridor Plan for Perth, which was published and adopted in 1970. The plan called for the creation of five "sub-regional" retail centres (Fremantle, Joondalup, Midland, Armadale and Rockingham) that would form the commercial and economic focus of each "node", and take the retail burden away from the central business district. The plan was not endorsed by Parliament until 1973, by which time Morley Shopping Centre had expanded twice (in 1970 and 1973), and Karrinyup was one of three new shopping centres that were completed in "middle-distance" suburbs, locations outside the designated corridors; the other two were Westfield Carousel at Cannington and Garden City, Booragoon, established a year earlier in 1972.

Construction of the larger Karrinyup Shopping Centre began in April 1972, and on completion was expected by its developers, St. Martins Properties Pty Ltd, to become the biggest shopping centre in the state. The centre consisted of a number of features including grade separated access from the car parks to the centre over the main vehicle routes to reduce driver confusion,  malls of terrazzo flooring, natural light provided through diffused roof lanterns, and enclosed air conditioned malls, the latter being considered unusual at the time by the local press. Construction of the centre was expected to be completed in September 1973.

Designed by architectural firm Cameron, Chisholm Nicol, the newer and larger centre on the  site was designed to include:
 Myer, 
 David Jones, 
 Walsh's menswear store,  
 Woolworths, 
 of space for 70 speciality shops
3000 parking bays
Food hall
Bus transit station
Room for a future community centre and hotel to be included in the complex

At the time of its proposal, it was originally expected to serve some 100,000 residents within its catchment area. By 1970, projections performed on behalf of the centre owners by PA Management Consultants had increased this projected catchment area to 250,000. Projected spending within this catchment area was estimated at A$188 million (1970), increasing to a catchment of 500,000 and projected spending of $376 million by 1982.

In order to grow both the five "sub-regional" retail centres and these off-corridor regional shopping centres, a Retail Shopping Policy was developed by the MRPA in 1976, and a Perth Metropolitan Region Retail Structure Plan was put in place to regulate the industry. This plan was amended as new centres were required. A review of the Corridor Plan in 1987 found that the sub-regional centres had failed to adequately compete against the regional shopping centres in the middle-distance suburbs.

In November 1991, Karrinyup was the first shopping centre in the state to implement a total ban on smoking inside the centre. It was reported in the Stirling Times that other centres had praised the concept despite tenants of the centre being concerned that the ban was an infringement on people's rights.

1981 redevelopment
In 1981, construction commenced on a small redevelopment. This would include an expansion to the eastern side of the mall, including the additional of Big W. The redevelopment opened the same year.

1996 redevelopment
During 1997, major works commenced to provide a significant upgrade to the centre.
Expansion of existing supermarket space by 
Addition of a second story, then known as the Boulevarde, to the main east–west mall axis
 of additional floor space for 60 new speciality outlets
A new north-east to south-west mall on the northern edge of the site
500 seat food court
800 additional parking bays, by construction of two new multi-story carparks, one on the southern frontage, and another on the north-east perimeter.

At the same time, major anchor tenant Myer undertook significant refurbishments to their store, including interior improvements and the addition of an in-store cafe.

The first stage of renovations were completed in November 1996, with the opening of the western end of the Boulevard and the south-west parking deck. Construction of the second stage was expected to commence in February 1997. Based on plans at the time, on completion of the redevelopment, Karrinyup would be the third largest shopping centre in Perth, behind the Galleria and Whitford City. By this point, 25% of available retail space in the redeveloped areas was already leased.

Renovations to the centre were completed in June 1998, with the official opening taking place on 29 September 1998. At the time of its official opening, the centre was running at 92% occupancy, with maximum average rent in 1998 of A$1013 per . By November 1998, the occupancy rate for the centre was up to 98%. Occupancy rates had reached 100% by March 1999, and in the prior three months the centre recorded a 34% increase in moving annual turnover, increasing to A$222 million in 1999.

Despite the construction of additional parking to the centre during the redevelopment, pressure on the centre's car parks still remained. As a consequence, the centre entered into successful discussions with nearby Karrinyup Primary School to obtain use of its ovals from 17 to 31 December, as overflow parking. As part of the deal, the centre would supply security guards and lighting, as well as a payment of A$1,500 (1998) to the school along with additional costs for any damage or repair works required. The use of the oval was not warmly received by parents of the school, but in speaking for the Education Minister Colin Barnett, the Legislative Council leader Norman Moore noted that the parents of the school were not consulted about the arrangement, and that it was well within the power and authority of the school principal to enter into such arrangements without the need for consultation with parents.

2019–2021 redevelopment

On 19 November 2018, construction commenced on the $800 million redevelopment to Karrinyup which had been planned as early as 2014. The redevelopment included:
An expanded 2-floor fashion mall known as "The Loop" connected from the Big W Mall to the former centre court entrance featuring international fashion brands like H&M, Uniqlo, Zara and Sephora.
A new food court, known as "The Cafe Terrace" on the second floor.
An expanded fresh food offering, known as "The Fresh Market" featuring a new Coles, Aldi and a slew of new specialty food purveyors.
A new alfresco entertainment and dining precinct, known as "The West Deck" and home to over 15 restaurants, a brand new 10-screen Hoyts cinema, Holey Moley, Archie Brothers Cirque Electric and Strike Bowling.
Renovations to the existing mall and a refurbished Myer, Big W and Woolworths.
Rebel, H&M, UNIQLO, Coco Republic, JB Hi-Fi, Sephora, Zara, LEGO, Mecca, City Beach, Nike, Adidas, General Pants, Macpac, JD Sports, Cotton On Mega, Goodlife Health Clubs and Strandbags as new and expanded mini-major stores.
Two new multi-deck parking lots with over 4,900 car bays along with expanded roof-top and basement parking.
Two new apartment complexes featuring 94 apartments, the first for a shopping centre in Western Australia, and the second in Australia, behind Chadstone Shopping Centre in Victoria.
On 21 November 2019, a small portion of the fashion loop opened featuring H&M, Mecca and more, along with a six level Multi-Deck parking lot. In April 2020, renovations to BIG W were completed along with expanded parking in June.

On 8 June, 2021, it was announced that stage 1 of the redevelopment would open The Fresh Market featuring Coles, Aldi and others, along with the ground floor of The Loop. This would include such retailers as Cotton On Mega, JD Sports, Nike, Adidas, Rebel, JB Hi-Fi and many others. Stage 1 proceeded to open on 29 July, 2021, featuring an additional 60 stores.

Stage 2 opened 7 October, 2021 and included level of The Loop including such retailers as Zara, Sephora and Coco Republic, as well as The Cafe Terrace featuring over 15 restaurants.

On 28 October, the final stage of the centre opened. It included a new outdoor dining precinct including a 10-screen Hoyts cinema complex, a Goodlife Health Clubs, Archie Brothers Cirque Electriq, Strike Bowling, Holey Moley Golf Club and over 20 restaurants. Similar to the opening of Stage 2, the centre hosted a "Play x Eat Festival" through its opening weekend, which also featured the opening of the first ever Lego store in Western Australia.

Ownership
At the time the 1996 renovations were completed, the centre was owned by the Australian superannuation fund UniSuper, Schroders Property Fund and Schroders Private Property Syndicate, with leasing arrangements being handled by Richard Ellis.

In April 2002, AMP Shopping Centre Trust purchased the outstanding 25% it did not already control in the centre from the Commonwealth Bank controlled investment vehicle, The Private Property Syndicate. The newly acquired stake combined with the holdings of the UniSuper and AMP Diversified Property Trust was vested in a new entity, the KSC Trust.

In September 2012, Westfield Group and Westfield Retail Trust sold their one-third holding in the centre to UniSuper, providing the latter with 100% ownership.

Architectural features
Perth-based architect Anna Meszaros was responsible for the interior design of the centre during the 1996 redevelopment. In an interview with Inside Retailing magazine, she noted how she wanted to move away from the "Disneyland effect of bright colours". Her brief was to provide customers to the centre a point of difference, particularly in the food court area. Like most conventional food courts, stores were arranged around a quadrangle, however unlike other food courts of the time the use of outside space was incorporated into the design. This was done by providing direct sunlight and outdoor connection by using curved skylights following the quadrangle shape. This was later upgraded to include an alfresco dining area. The area in the middle of the food court was raised using a timber floor with removable dining furniture, providing for significant flexibility in how it is used.

Events
During the centre's life, a number of significant international personalities have visited the centre in connection with major events and fundraising efforts. Once such visit was by Ronan Keating on 27 July 2002; 500 local fans packed the Centre Court area to get a glimpse of the performer, who had been in concert at Perth Entertainment Centre the previous night.

The centre also maintains active links to the surrounding community. More recently it implemented a walking program in conjunction with the Injury Control Council of Western Australia. Trained walking leaders accompany groups through the centre twice a week and perform both warm-up and cool down exercises. The Rotary Club of Scarborough also organises and operates a weekly swap meet, held each Sunday in the southern under cover parking area.

Transport
Adjoining the centre is the Karrinyup bus station. The station, provides bus services to surrounding suburbs from Warwick to Stirling, and out to Scarborough. Bus services also connect the centre to the Joondalup railway line and Perth's central business district via connections at Warwick railway station and Stirling railway station.

Facilities
The centre is currently occupied by seven major tenants. Two department stores, one discount-department store, three supermarkets and one cinema complex.

- 3-Floor Myer department store

- 2-Floor David Jones department store.

- Big W Discount Department Store

- Woolworths Supermarket

- Coles Supermarket

- Aldi Supermarket

- 10-screen Hoyts cinema complex

References

Further reading

External links
Collection of aerial photographs depicting construction and evolution of Karrinyup Shopping Centre from 1972 to 1979, State Library of Western Australia

Shopping malls established in 1973
Shopping centres in Perth, Western Australia
Karrinyup, Western Australia